"Give a Little Love", by the Bay City Rollers, was a UK number-one single for three weeks in July 1975. It was written by John Goodison and Phil Wainman and produced by Wainman. It was the band's second and final UK number one, and was the 11th biggest British hit of 1975. Unlike the single version, the original UK album version (on the LP Wouldn't You Like It) was augmented with a string section, while the US-only Bay City Rollers album had only the basic rhythm track and no strings.

This song was not released as a single in the United States, and therefore failed to chart. Their follow-up hit a few months later, however, "Saturday Night," reached No. 1 in the United States and Canada, but was not re-released in the UK after having failed to chart in 1973.

Track listing
 "Give a Little Love" – 3:29
 "She'll Be Crying Over You" – 3:12

Chart performance

Weekly charts

Year-end charts

References

External links
 

1975 singles
1975 songs
Bay City Rollers songs
UK Singles Chart number-one singles
Irish Singles Chart number-one singles
Song recordings produced by Phil Wainman
Songs written by Phil Wainman
Arista Records singles
Songs written by John Goodison (musician)